A list of animated feature films first released in 1980.

See also
 List of animated television series of 1980

References

 Feature films
1980
1980-related lists